The Rev.  John Skinner (1772–1839) was a parish vicar and amateur antiquarian and archaeologist operating mainly in the area of Bath and the villages of northern Somerset in the early nineteenth century.

Life 
Skinner was born in Claverton and educated at Oxford, before becoming vicar of Camerton, Somerset from 1800 to 1839. He excavated numerous antiquities, especially barrows, such as those at Priddy, Stoney Littleton and the site which later became RAF Charmy Down; and he made visits for antiquarian purposes to many places.

He carried out excavations at Priddy Nine Barrows and Ashen Hill Barrow Cemeteries, opening many of the barrows identified cremation burials in an oval cyst which was covered by a flat stone just below where ground level would have been in the Bronze Age. He also uncovered bronze daggers and spear head, decorative amber beads, a bronze ring and a small incense cup.

Before his role as the vicar of Camerton from 1800 to 1839, he worked in a lawyer's office.

His parents were Russell Skinner and Mary Page. He married Anna Holmes in 1805, by whom he had five children, three of whom (Anna, Fitz Owen and Joseph Henry) lived into adulthood.

Writings 
He kept a regular journal as rector of Camerton, from 1803 until 1834. A "tormented and querulous" man in the words of Virginia Woolf, but "at the same time conscientious and able",  he came to his living at Camerton to be  He bequeathed his 146 volumes of his journals (1803–34), along with travel diaries and antiquarian and other miscellanea, to the British Museum. He stipulated that the journals should not be opened until fifty years after his death. Virginia Woolf observed, "In fifty years after his death, when the diaries were published, people would know not only that John Skinner was a great antiquary, but that he was a much wronged and suffering man."  These journals are now preserved at the British Library. The manuscripts include accounts of a West Country tour (1797), Hadrian's Wall (1801) and the isle of Anglesey (1802). His 1802 visit to Anglesey to see the island's Celtic remains, began by rowing across the Menai Strait to land at Llanidan. His view was that the Old Church of St Nidan "seems superior to the generality of Welsh buildings of the kind", with its double roof and two bells, but he also said that "the interior of the building has little to attract notice".

His journals were illustrated by many watercolour paintings; among them this August 1825 sketch of the newly-built Skerne Bridge on the Stockton and Darlington Railway. It is significant as the only image of the bridge as it was originally built, before the addition of strengthening buttresses that appear in every other image.

His tour of Wales in 1835, when he was 63, now consists of 4 bound volumes comprising descriptive text and nearly 750 sketches, an average of 15 a day, starting with coastal scenes taken when on the packet from Bristol to Swansea, landscapes, castles, abbeys, cromlechs, inscribed stones and towns, Roman roads, but rarely mansions.

Death 
Skinner committed suicide by shooting himself in 1839, despite which he may have been buried in consecrated ground at Camerton. The inquest said that Skinner's "mind had latterly been very much affected" and that he had shot himself in "a state of derangement".

References

Further reading 
 Coombs, Howard and Arthur N. Bax, eds (1930) Journal of a Somerset rector: John Skinner, A.M., antiquary, 1772–1839. Parochial affairs of the parish of Camerton, 1822–1832. British Library mss. nos. 33673-33728. London: John Murray. [Revised and enlarged edn  entitled Journal of a Somerset rector, 1803–1834: parochial affairs of the Parish of Camerton British Museum manuscripts no. 33635-33728 & EG 3099F-3123F by Howard and Peter Coombs, Bath: Kingsmead 1971. New edn, same eds, Oxford: Oxford University Press 1984.]
Jones, Roger (1999) John Skinner's Visit to the Channel Islands: Guernsey, August 1827. Review of the Guernsey Society (Spring 1999).
Skinner, John (1803–34) Journals. Manuscripts: British Library Add MS 33633-33728; subsequent tours are in British Library, Egerton MS 3099–3119
Jones, Roger,(editor), West Country tour : being the diary of a tour through the counties of Somerset, Devon and Cornwall in 1797 by John Skinner, (Ex Libris Press, Bradford on Avon, 1985). Based on British Library Add MS 33635.
Skinner, John, (edited and transcribed by Rev John Fisher) "Ten Days Tour in Anglesey, 1802", published as a supplement to Archaeologia Cambrensis, July 1908, based on British Library Add MS 33636; copy (of original)in National Library of Wales MS 21031.

1772 births
1839 deaths
English archaeologists
19th-century English Anglican priests
English antiquarians
History of Somerset
Suicides by firearm in England
1830s suicides